Sarımsaklı is a town in the Ayvalık District of Balıkesir Province in the Marmara Region of Turkey. The town's seems to mean "land of garlic" but the region's main production is olives and tourism.

History

Gateluzio, Prince of the Lesbos Island and a taxpayer to the Ottoman Empire, delayed his payments and Mehmed the Conqueror sent the Ottoman Navy to the island.  Lesbos Island was conquered and annexed by the Ottoman Empire. For the first time in the history of Sarimsakli, a battalion of Janissary was engarrisoned in order to monitor the activities near the island and on the shore of Anatolia.

The Turkish people who arrived from Yugoslavia and Greece were settled mainly in this area.

Geography

The Beach of Sarimsakli is one of the longest in Turkey. It is located in the county of Ayvalık. It hosts thousands of domestic and foreign tourists every year. The region boasts a Mediterranean climate.

See also
 Ayvalık
 Ayvalık Islands
 Marinas in Turkey
 Croque-monsieur

External links
 sarımsaklı otelleri,sarımsaklı pansiyonları
Cunda Island
Panoramic pictures of island Tr
AYKUSAD, Ayvalık Association of Culture and Arts (Turkish)
Pictures of Ayvalık

Towns in Turkey
Populated places in Balıkesir Province